The Five Days of Milan was an insurrection and a major event in the Revolutionary Year of 1848 that started the First Italian War of Independence. On 18 March, a rebellion arose in the city of Milan, and in five days of street fighting drove Marshal Radetzky and his Austrian soldiers from the city.

Background
In 1848, the Milanese launched an anti-Austrian campaign as early as 1 January. On New Year's Day the Milanese started to boycott gambling and tobacco products, which were government monopolies that brought in over 5 million lire a year. The boycott culminated in a bloody street battle on 3 January, when Austrian soldiers, in batches of three, were being insulted and pelted with stones by an angry crowd. The soldiers then gathered together in groups of a dozen and charged the crowd with swords and bayonets, killing five and wounding another 59. Radetzky confined his troops to barracks for five days. The protests were over, but two months later, when news reached Milan of the uprising in Vienna and the fall of Metternich, the Milanese took to the streets again, on 18 March.

Events

Almost simultaneous with the popular uprisings of 1848 in the Kingdom of Lombardy–Venetia, on 18 March of that year, the city of Milan also rose. This was the first evidence of how effective popular initiative, guided by those in the Risorgimento, was able to influence Charles Albert of Sardinia.

The Austrian garrison at Milan was well equipped and commanded by an experienced general, Joseph Radetzky von Radetz, who despite being over 80 years old, was energetic and rigid. Radetzky had no intention of yielding to the uprising.

However, the whole city fought throughout the streets, raising barricades, firing from windows and roofs, and urging the rural population to join them. The populace was backed by the archbishop and at least 100 priests joined in the fighting against the Austrians. A bust of Pope Pius IX was hoisted onto the barricades. A provisional government of Milan was formed and presided over by the podestà, Gabrio Casati and a council of war under Carlo Cattaneo. The Martinitt (orphanage children) worked as message runners to all parts of the town.

Radetzky saw the difficulty of resisting under siege in the city centre, but while afraid of being attacked by the Piedmontese army and peasants from the countryside, he preferred to withdraw after losing control of the Porta Tosa (now Porta Vittoria) to the rebels. On the evening of 22 March, the Austrians withdrew towards the "Quadrilatero" (the fortified zone made up of the four cities of Verona, Legnago, Mantua and Peschiera del Garda), taking with them several hostages arrested at the start of the uprising. Meanwhile, the rest of Lombard and Venetic territory was free.

In memory of these days, the official newspaper of the temporary government was called simply Il 22 marzo (22 March), which began publication on 26 March at the Palazzo Marino under the direction of Carlo Tenca. A monument to the uprising by the sculptor Giuseppe Grandi was built at what is now Porta Vittoria.

Almost a century later, in 1943, the uprising of Naples against WWII Nazi occupation was named The Four Days of Naples, in conscious emulation of the earlier Milan event.

See also
 Luisa Battistati
 Carlo Cattaneo
 Enrico Dandolo
 Luciano Manara
 Emilio Morosini
 Guerra regia e guerra di popolo
 Revolutions of 1848 in the Italian states

References

Bibliography

In Italian
 Piero Pieri, Storia militare del Risorgimento – volume 1 & 2, Einaudi, Torino, 1962
 Carlo Cattaneo, Dell'insurrezione di Milano nel 1848 e della successiva guerra, e-text Liber liber/Progetto Manuzio
 Antonio Scurati, Una storia romantica, romanzo Bompiani, 2007
 Elena Fontanella, a cura di, Giovani ribelli del '48. Memorie del Risorgimento lombardo , Firenze, Fratelli Alinari, 2011. . Testi di Aldo A. Mola, Giancarlo Lacchin, Roberto Lauro, Maurizio Griffo, Agostino Giovagnoli, Cecilia Dau Novelli, Romano Bracalini, Carlo Cattaneo, Gianni Oliva, Emanuele Bettini, Matteo Sanfilippo, Giuseppe Poletta, Franco Della Peruta, Fulvio Peirone, Gabriella Bonacchi, Anna Maria Isastia, Elena Fontanella, Andrea Vento, Vittorio Nichilo, Giorgio Cosmacini, Roberto Guerri, Lucia Romaniello, Giuseppe Garibaldi, Gian Paolo Caprettini, Gian Mario Benzing, Roberto Cassanelli.

External links

  "Liceo Berchet di Milano" – a more detailed account of the Five Days
  Monument to the "Cinque Giornate di Milano"

Revolutions of 1848 in the Italian states
History of Milan
1848 in Italy
1848 in the Austrian Empire
Battles involving Austria
Battles involving Italy
Conflicts in 1848
Battles of the First Italian War of Independence
Battles in Lombardy
Revolts of the Italian unification
March 1848 events
States and territories established in 1848
States and territories disestablished in 1848
1848 establishments in Italy
1848 disestablishments in Italy
19th century in Milan
Rebellions against the Austrian Empire
Joseph Radetzky von Radetz